Karin Olsson may refer to:

Karin Olsson (canoeist) (born 1961), Swedish sprint canoer
Karin Margareta Olsson (born 1975), Swedish bobsledder
, see List of members of the parliament of Sweden, 1994–1998
Karin Olsson (karateka) (born 1964), Swedish karateka

See also
Karen Olsen (disambiguation)